The batzen is an historical Swiss, south German and Austrian coin. It was first produced in Berne, Switzerland, from 1492 and continued in use there until the mid-19th century.

Name 
Bernese chronicler Valerius Anshelm explained the word from a folk etymology perspective saying that it came from Bëtz ("bear"), the heraldic animal of the Swiss canton, which was embossed on the reverse of the coin. The word probably goes back to Upper German (particularly Bavarian) batzen ("stick together") or Batzen ("lump, thick piece"), since it referred to a Dickpfennig ("fat pfennig").

History 
A double Plappart, which soon became known as a Batzen, was minted in Berne from 1492. The minting of Batzen in Salzburg is also attested early on, in 1495. 

The Batzen was originally minted in silver, but from the 17th century in billon. The value of the Batzen varied over time depending on where it was minted. The value of a Bernese Batzen initially corresponded to four Kreuzer. Since the Gulden was worth 60 Kreuzer, 1 Batzen in Berne, Freiburg and Solothurn also corresponded to one fifteenth of a Gulden. Later there were also Grossi ("thick ones", i.e. Groschen) worth 5 Batzen. Other places of the Old Confederation and some southern German states soon followed Berne's example. Zurich minted 16 Batzen to the Gulden from 1500 onwards. In 1564, a Thaler was worth 16 Constance Batzen. Around 1600, 1 Bocksthaler (Schaffhausen Thaler) was worth 17 Batzen or 68 Kreuzer, so 1 Batzen =  Thaler = 4 Kreuzer In the early 18th century the Hohlbatzen ("hollow Batzen") was worth five Kreuzer (1/12 Reichsgulden), the regular Batzen four Kreuzer, the Basle and Zurich Batzen were valued at  Gulden, the St. Gallen Batzen at  Gulden. In the second half of the 18th century, 1 Reichsbatzen was worth 16 Pfennigs, 1 Zurich Batzen was 15 Pfennigs, 1 Bernese and 1 Chur Batzen was 14 Pfennigs.

The Batzen became a widespread intermediate currency between the numerous large and small silver coins circulating in Europe. Since some of the South German Batzen were of very different quality, the Reichstag in 1522 and 1524 spoke out against these coins. In southern Germany they were minted until 1536, but were banned with the Imperial Minting Ordinance of 1559, but was still, for example in Nuremberg, in 1564 in use as a currency designation. In Switzerland, on the other hand, the Batzen went unchallenged.

In the case of some so-called Kipper coins, however, the Batzen was used to name these interim coins. In the time of counterfeiting, the Kipper and Wipper period, for example in Thuringia inter alia in the mints of Gotha (1621–1623) and Weimar (1619–1622), others Kipper coins of worth three and six Batzen were minted (the Dreibätzner and Sechsbätzner). The coins could not be objected to, because they were state coins not Thaler coins or divisions of them, which had to conform to imperial coinage regulations.

Even after the Munich Coinage Treaty of 1837, Batzen were minted as Scheidemünzen to the value of four Kreuzers in some member states, for example in the Free City of Frankfurt. The coins were in use until the introduction of the Mark. As late as 1873, the increase in the price of beer by the Frankfurt breweries from 4 to 4½ Kreuzer triggered the Frankfurt beer riot, which began with the demand "I want Batzen beer" (Mir wolle Batzebier) and led to serious social unrest.

When a Swiss single currency was introduced for the first time in 1798–1803 by the Helvetic Republic, the Batzen was also integrated into the system. One franc was worth ten Batzen, a Batzen in turn ten centimes, with 10 Swiss francs being equivalent to a Louis d'or. After the end of the single currency, coin sovereignty was returned to the cantons, some of which retained the decimal Franc-Batzen-Rappen division (Aargau, cit of Basle, Berne, Freiburg, Lucerne, Solothurn, Unterwalden, Uri, Vaud, Valais, Zug) . Only in the canton of Neuchâtel was a franc worth 10½ Batzen. The other cantons introduced currencies with a Gulden-Schilling or Florin-Livre system. The era of the Batzen ended in 1850 with the introduction of the new Swiss franc as the single Swiss currency. An old franc did not correspond to a new franc. Seven Batzen could be exchanged for a new franc in 1850. Meanwhile the Batzen became a colloquial term for the 10 rappen coin.

References

Medieval currencies
Coins of the Holy Roman Empire
Modern obsolete currencies
Currencies of Switzerland